Piet van Zyl may refer to:

 Piet van Zyl (rugby union, born 1989), South African international rugby union player
 Piet van Zyl (rugby union, born 1979), South African-born Namibian international rugby union player